The largest state-owned hospital in Uganda is Mulago Hospital in Kampala with around 1,500 beds. It was built in 1962.

Ian Clarke, a physician and missionary from Northern Ireland, built the 200-bed International Hospital Kampala, which was the first International Organization for Standardization-certified hospital in the country.

According to a published report in 2009, the distribution of healthcare facilities and funding heavily favored urban centers, with 70 percent of physicians and 40 percent of nurses and midwives based in urban areas, where they served only 12 percent of Uganda's population.

National referral hospitals
 Butabika National Referral Hospital
 Mulago National Referral Hospital

Specialized government hospitals
 Mulago National Specialised Hospital
 Mulago Women's Referral Hospital
 Uganda Cancer Institute
 Uganda Heart Institute

Regional referral hospitals
 Arua Regional Referral Hospital
 Entebbe Regional Referral Hospital.
 Fort Portal Regional Referral Hospital
 Gulu Regional Referral Hospital
 Hoima Regional Referral Hospital
 Jinja Regional Referral Hospital
 Kabale Regional Referral Hospital
 Old Mulago Hospital
 Kayunga Regional Referral Hospital
 Lira Regional Referral Hospital
 Masaka Regional Referral Hospital
 Mbale Regional Referral Hospital
 Mbarara Regional Referral Hospital
 Moroto Regional Referral Hospital
 Mubende Regional Referral Hospital
 Soroti Regional Referral Hospital

District hospitals
 Abim General Hospital
 Adjumani General Hospital
 Anaka General Hospital  
 Apac General Hospital
 Atutur General Hospital
 Bududa General Hospital
 Bugiri General Hospital
 Bukwo General Hospital
 Bundibugyo General Hospital
 Busolwe General Hospital
 Iganga General Hospital
 Itojo Hospital
 Kaabong General Hospital
 Kagadi General Hospital
 Kalisizo General Hospital
 Kamuli General Hospital
 Kapchorwa General Hospital
 Kasese Municipal Health Centre III
 Katakwi General Hospital 
 Kawolo General Hospital
 Kiboga General Hospital
 Kiryandongo General Hospital
 Kitagata General Hospital
 Kitgum Hospital
 Kyenjojo General Hospital
 Lyantonde General Hospital
 Masafu General Hospital
 Masindi General Hospital
 Mityana Hospital
 Moyo General Hospital
 Mpigi Hospital
 Mukono General hospital
 Nakaseke General Hospital
 Nebbi General Hospital
 Pallisa General Hospital
 Rakai General Hospital
 Tororo General Hospital
 Yumbe General Hospital

Other government hospitals
 Buwenge General Hospital - Buwenge, Jinja District
 Bwera General Hospital
 Entebbe General Hospital
 Iran–Uganda Hospital
 Kawempe General Hospital - Kawempe, Kampala
 Kiruddu General Hospital - Makindye Division, Kampala 
 Naguru General Hospital - Naguru, Kampala
 Arua Regional Cancer Centre
 Mbarara Regional Cancer Centre
 Gulu Regional Cancer Centre
 Mbale Regional Cancer Centre

Non-government non-profit hospitals
 Aga Khan University Hospital, Kampala (in development)
 Angal Hospital
 Bishop Ceaser Asili Memorial Hospital
 Buluba Hospital 
 Bwindi Community Hospital
 CoRSU Rehabilitation Hospital
 CURE Children's Hospital of Uganda
 Entebbe Children's Surgical Hospital
 Galilee Community General Jewish Hospital of Uganda
 Galilee MediCare Uganda
 Holy Family Hospital Nyapea
 Holy Innocents Children's Hospital
 Ishaka Adventist Hospital
 Kagando Hospital
 Kalongo Hospital
 Kamuli Mission Hospital
 Kilembe Mines Hospital
 Kisiizi Hospital
 Kisubi Hospital
 Kitojo Hospital
 Kitovu Hospital
 Kiwoko Hospital
 Kuluva Hospital
 Lacor Hospital
 Lubaga Hospital
 Lwala Hospital Kaberamaido
 Makerere University Hospital
 Matany Hospital
 Mayanja Memorial Hospital
 Mengo Hospital
Mildmay Uganda Hospital 
 Mutolere Hospital
 Naggalama Hospital
 Ngora Hospital
 Nkokonjeru Hospital
 Nkozi Hospital
 Nsambya Hospital
 Pope John’s Hospital Aber
 Nyenga Mission Hospital
 Ruharo Mission Hospital
 Rushere Community Hospital
 St. Charles Lwanga Buikwe Hospital
 St. Francis Hospital Nkokonjeru
 St. Francis Hospital Nyenga
 St. Joseph's Hospital Kitgum
 St. Joseph’s Hospital Maracha
 Uganda Martyrs’ Hospital Ibanda
 Villa Maria Hospital
 Virika Hospital
 Whisper's Magical Children's Hospital.
 Restoration Gateway Hospital

Private for-profit hospitals

 TMR International Hospital - Naalya, Kampala
 Medipal International Hospital - Kololo, Kampala
 Bethany Women's and Family Hospital, Luzira
International Specialized Hospital of Uganda
 Case Medical Centre
 International Hospital Kampala - Namuwongo, Kampala
Nile International Hospital
UMC Victoria Hospital, Bukoto, Kampala
 Kampala Hospital - Kololo, Kampala
 Kampala International University Teaching Hospital - Bushenyi
 Kampala Medical Chambers Hospital
 Kibuli Hospital
 Mbarara Community Hospital - Mbarara

 Nakasero Hospital - Nakasero, Kampala
 Norvik Hospital - Nakasero, Kampala
  Le Mémorial Hospital- Kigo Rd 
 Old Kampala Hospital - Kampala Hill, Kampala
 Paragon Hospital - Bugoloobi, Kampala
 Women's Hospital International and Fertility Centre - Bukoto, Kampala
 Mukwaya General Hospital - Nsambya, Kampala.
 Bamu Hospital Limited - Mateete, Sembabule District.
 Life Line International Hospital - Zana, Wakiso District
 Le Memorial Hospital - Lweza, Wakiso District.
 Makerere University Teaching Hospital - Katalemwa, Wakiso District (In development)

Security forces hospitals
 Bombo Military Hospital - Bombo
 Entebbe Military Hospital - Entebbe
 Gulu Military Hospital - Gulu
 Mbuya Military Hospital - Mbuya
 Murchison Bay Hospital - Luzira
 Nakasongola Military Hospital - Nakasongola

References

External links
 Profile of Ugandan hospitals at Medicstravel.co.uk
 Profile of Ugandan hospitals at Studentbmj.com
 Profile of Paragon Hospital
 Hospital Profile of Case Medical Center at casemedcare.org
 Hospital profile of Kampala Medical Chambers Hospital at kampalamedicalchambers.org
 Uganda's Private Hospitals In Financial Mess, In 2008

Medical and health organisations based in Uganda
Lists of buildings and structures in Uganda
Uganda
Uganda